Li Jiang (born January 1958) is a Chinese politician, serving since 2018 as chairwoman of the Yunnan Provincial Committee of the Chinese People's Political Consultative Conference.

Biography
Li was born in Kunming, Yunnan, in January 1958. During the Cultural Revolution, she was a sent-down youth in Huize County and then worked in a lead zinc miner factory. After resuming the college entrance examination, in 1978, she was admitted to Kunming University of Science and Technology, majoring in steelmaking. After graduation, she worked at the university's Communist Youth League.

Li joined the Chinese Communist Party (CCP) in January 1976. He served as deputy mayor of Yuxi in October 1999, and soon was promoted to the mayor position. In February 2001, she was elevated to party secretary, her first foray into a municipal leadership role. In February 2003, she was appointed head of Organization Department of Yunnan Provincial Committee of the Chinese Communist Party, and held that office until April 2008. In January 2008 she took up the post of vice governor which she held from 2008 to 2012, although she remained head of Organization Department until April of that same year. In June 2012, she rose to become executive vice governor. In January 2017, she became deputy chairwoman of the Yunnan Provincial Committee of the Chinese People's Political Consultative Conference, rising to chairwoman the next year.

References

1958 births
Living people
People from Kunming
Chinese women in politics
Kunming University of Science and Technology alumni
Mayors of Yuxi
People's Republic of China politicians from Yunnan
Chinese Communist Party politicians from Yunnan